Spring Creek Lake may refer to:

Spring Creek Lake located in Goodhue County, Minnesota
Spring Creek Lake located in Roger Mills County, Oklahoma